Dwayne Eugene Evans (born October 13, 1958) is an American athlete who mainly competed in the 200 meters.

He competed for the United States in the 1976 Summer Olympics held in Montreal, Quebec, Canada, where he won the bronze medal in the men's 200 metres event. That same year, he had just graduated from South Mountain High School in Phoenix, Arizona. That year he also set the still standing NFHS national high school records in the 220 yard dash at 20.5. The federation converted record-keeping to metric distances shortly afterward. He was Track and Field News "High School Athlete of the Year" in 1976. He continued to run, achieving his PR of 20.08 in 1987.

Evans is currently coaching Track at South Mountain High School in Phoenix, Arizona, and has twin daughters who are track athletes at Texas Tech University.

References

External links

1958 births
Living people
American male sprinters
Olympic bronze medalists for the United States in track and field
Athletes (track and field) at the 1976 Summer Olympics
Athletes (track and field) at the 1979 Pan American Games
Track and field athletes from Phoenix, Arizona
Arizona State Sun Devils men's track and field athletes
Medalists at the 1976 Summer Olympics
Goodwill Games medalists in athletics
Competitors at the 1986 Goodwill Games
Pan American Games track and field athletes for the United States